Aspergillus neoafricanus is a species of fungus in the genus Aspergillus. It is from the Terrei section. The species was first described in 2011. It has been isolated from soil in Ghana, Panama, and Japan. It has been reported to produce aspulvinone, asterriquinone, butyrolactones, citreoviridin, mevinolin, terrain, and terrequinone A.

Growth and morphology

A. neoafricanus has been cultivated on both Czapek yeast extract agar (CYA) plates and Malt Extract Agar Oxoid® (MEAOX) plates. The growth morphology of the colonies can be seen in the pictures below.

References 

neoafricanus
Fungi described in 2011